August Werner Schellenberg (July 25, 1936 – August 15, 2013) was a Canadian actor. He played Randolph in the first three installments of the Free Willy film series (1993–1997) as well as characters in Black Robe (1991), The New World (2005), and dozens of other films and television shows.

During his career, Schellenberg won a Gemini Award in 1986 and a Genie Award in 1991, as well as being nominated for a Primetime Emmy Award in 2007.

Life and career
Schellenberg was born and lived in Montreal, Quebec, until he moved to Toronto, Ontario, in 1967. He was of English, Mohawk and Swiss-German descent. He was based in Toronto until 1995. He lived in Dallas, Texas, with his wife, actress Joan Karasevich. He was the father of three daughters, two with Karasevich. He was trained at the National Theatre School of Canada from 1963 to 1966.

His initial work was in the Don Shebib-directed coming-of-age film Rip-Off, in 1971. In 1981, he did voices for the animated film Heavy Metal. During the 1990s he had major roles in Black Robe (as Chomina), Free Willy and its sequels (as Randolph Johnson), Iron Will (Ned Dodd), True Heart (Khonanesta), and TV film Crazy Horse (Sitting Bull). He went on to star as Chief Powhatan in Terrence Malick's 2005 film The New World. He also had roles in Disney's Eight Below and the doco within a film The Green Chain (2007). In 2011, he appeared in two episodes of the television series Stargate Universe as Yaozu. His favorite role was that of Sitting Bull in the film Crazy Horse, a character he reprised in the film version of the Dee Brown bestseller Bury My Heart at Wounded Knee, for which he received an Emmy nomination. He also starred in Dreamkeeper (2003) as Pete Chasing Horse.

Schellenberg was nominated for three Genie Awards and won one (for Black Robe). He was also nominated for two Gemini Awards, and won one (for the television movie The Prodigal).

In 2012, he performed the title role in an all-aboriginal production of William Shakespeare's King Lear at the National Arts Centre in Ottawa, alongside a cast that also included Billy Merasty as Gloucester, Tantoo Cardinal as Regan, Jani Lauzon in a dual role as Cordelia and the Fool, Craig Lauzon as Kent, and the play's assistant director, Lorne Cardinal, as The Duke of Albany.

During his lifetime, Schellenberg taught acting seminars at Toronto's Centre for Indigenous Theatre and York University. He conducted motivational workshops in schools and for cultural and community organizations across North America. Schellenberg's younger brother played Dior in Grey's Anatomy, season 5. Shortly after that, August died of lung cancer.

Death
Schellenberg died on August 15, 2013, in Dallas, Texas after a long battle with lung cancer. He was interred at Sparkman-Hillcrest Memorial Park Cemetery.

Filmography

Film

 Rip-Off (1971)
 A Fan's Notes (1972)
 Between Friends (1973)
 One Man (1977) - Ernie Carrick
 Power Play (1978) - Minh
 Drying Up the Streets (1978) - Nick
 Bear Island (1979) - Marine Technician
 The Coffin Affair (1980) - Wilbert Coffin
 Death Hunt (1981) - Deak De Bleargue
 Heavy Metal (1981) - Norl (segment "Den") / Taarak (segment "Taarna") (voice)
 Kings and Desperate Men (1981) - Stanley Aldini
 Latitude 55° (1982) - Josef Przysiezny
 The Ruffian (1983) - Nelson Harting
 Running Brave (1983) - Billy's Father
 Cross Country (1983) - Glen Cosgrove
 Covergirl (1984) - Joel Vacchio
 Best Revenge (1984) - Captain of 'Recon Star'
 The Painted Door (1984)
 Confidential (1986) - Charles Ripley
 Mark of Cain (1986) - Otto
 Qui a tiré sur nos histoires d'amour (1986) - Fabien
 Long Lance (1986) - (voice)
 The Return of Ben Casey (1988, TV Movie) - Dr. Madigan
 Divided Loyalties (1990)
 Black Robe (1991) - Chomina
 Lakota Moon (1992, TV Movie) - Bull Elk
 Free Willy (1993) - Randolph Johnson
 Geronimo (1993, TV Movie) - Cochise
 Iron Will (1994) - Ned Dodd
 Getting Gotti (1994, TV Movie) Willie Boy Johnson
 Lakota Woman: Siege at Wounded Knee (1994, TV Movie) - Dick Wilson
 Tecumseh: The Last Warrior (1995, TV Movie) - Black Hoof
 Free Willy 2: The Adventure Home (1995) - Randolph Johnson
 Crazy Horse (1996, TV Movie) - Sitting Bull
 The Siege at Ruby Ridge (1996, TV Movie) - Native American
 Free Willy 3: The Rescue (1997) - Randolph Johnson
 Silence (1997) - Johnny
 True Heart (1997) - Khonanesta
 Scattering Dad (1998, TV Movie) - Fierce Crow
 High Noon (2000, TV Movie) - Antonio
 The Unsaid (2001) - Detective Hannah
 Dreamkeeper (2003, TV Movie) - Grandpa
 Tremors 4: The Legend Begins (2004) - Tecopa
 Going The Distance (2004) - Emile
 The New World (2005) - Chief Powhatan
 Eight Below (2006) - Mindo
 Bury My Heart at Wounded Knee (2007, TV Movie) - Sitting Bull
 The Green Chain (2007) - The Executive - John Clements
 Missionary Man (2007) - White Deer
 45 R.P.M. (2008) - Peter George Moses
 The Last Movie (2012) - Samuel Booker (final film role)

Television/miscellaneous
 Shoestring Theatre (1964, Episode: "The Dark Mirror")
 The New Avengers (1977, Episode: "Forward Base") - Bailey
 The Hitchhiker (1983, Episode: "When Morning Comes") - Bob Ames
 The Equalizer (1986, Episode: "Unpunished Crimes") - Brennan
 Phillip Marlowe (1986, Episode: "Blackmailers Don't Shoot") - Johnny Tango
 Lance et compte (1986 television series) - Allan Goldberg
 Airwolf (1987, Episode: "Deathtrain") - Gregori Nobokov
 Champagne Charlie (1989) - General Butler
 North of 60 (1994–1995) - Ben Montour
 The Adventures of Tintin (1992) - (English version, voice)
 Walker Texas Ranger (1994–1995) - Billy Gray Wolf
 Lonesome Dove: The Series (1994, Episode: "Last Stand") - Chief Iron Bow
 The West - episodes - Speck of the Future, Death Runs Riot, and Fight No More Forever - voice (1996)
 So Weird (2000, Episode: "Destiny") - Tom Martinez
 Chiefs (2002, TV Mini-Series documentary) - Sitting Bull
 The Making of 'DreamKeeper (2004, Video documentary short) - Himself
 Making 'The New World (2006, Video documentary) - Himself
 Saving Grace (2007–2010) - GeePaw
 Grey's Anatomy (2008, Episode: "These Ties That Bind") - Clay Bedonie

References

External links
 
 
 

1936 births
2013 deaths
20th-century Canadian male actors
21st-century Canadian male actors
Best Supporting Actor Genie and Canadian Screen Award winners
Burials at Sparkman-Hillcrest Memorial Park Cemetery
Canadian expatriates in the United States
Canadian male film actors
Canadian male Shakespearean actors
Canadian male television actors
Canadian male voice actors
Canadian Métis people
Canadian people of English descent
Canadian people of Mohawk descent
Canadian people of Swiss-German descent
Deaths from cancer in Texas
Deaths from lung cancer
First Nations male actors
Male actors from Montreal
National Theatre School of Canada alumni